Claude P. "Dett" Dettloff (July 7, 1899 in Chippewa Falls, Wisconsin – July 18, 1978, Vancouver, British Columbia, Canada) was an American photographer who gained fame for the picture which has become known as Wait for Me, Daddy. Dettloff began his career with the Minneapolis Journal in 1923 and worked for eleven years with The Winnipeg Tribune. He joined the Vancouver newspaper The Province in 1936, becoming the chief photographer.

Dettloff took the picture on October 1, 1940, as The British Columbia Regiment (Duke of Connaught's Own) went to war. The picture appeared October 2, 1940 in The Province. The picture was named one of ten best pictures of the 1940s by Life. The picture was taken at 9 meters with a 3¼ × 4¼ Speed Graphic and a 13.5 C.M. Zeiss lens and the exposure was 1/200 of a second at F.8, using Agfa film.

References 

1899 births
1978 deaths
American expatriates in Canada
20th-century American photographers
Artists from Vancouver
Artists from Wisconsin
Canadian photographers
People from Chippewa Falls, Wisconsin